The British Academy Television Craft Awards of 2006 are presented by the British Academy of Film and Television Arts (BAFTA) and were held on 19 May 2006 at The Dorchester, Mayfair, the ceremony was hosted by Jon Culshaw for the second year in a row.

Winners and nominees
Winners will be listed first and highlighted in boldface.

{| class="wikitable"
|-
! style="background:#BDB76B; width:50%" |  Best Director
! style="background:#BDB76B; width:50%" |  Best Writer
|-
| valign="top" |
 Brian Percival – Much Ado About Nothing
 Joe Ahearne – Doctor Who
 Simon Cellan Jones – The Queen's Sister
 Justin Chadwick – Bleak House
| valign="top" |
 Peter Kosminsky – The Government Inspector
 Andrew Davies – Bleak House Russell T Davies – Doctor Who Ricky Gervais, Stephen Merchant – Extras|-
|-
! style="background:#BDB76B; width:50%" |  Best Breakthrough Talent 
! style="background:#BDB76B; width:50%" |  Best Original Television Music
|-
| valign="top" |
 Lee Phillips – How to Start Your Own Country
 Dan Edge – Israel and the Arabs: Elusive Peace Misha Manson-Smith – High Spirits with Shirley Ghostman Edward Thomas – Doctor Who| valign="top" |
 'Elizabeth I – Rob Lane Casanova – Murray Gold
 The Girl in The Café – Nicholas Hooper
 The Government Inspector – Jocelyn Pook
|-
|-
! style="background:#BDB76B; width:50%" |  Best New Media Developer
! style="background:#BDB76B; width:50%" |  Best Make-Up and Hair Design
|-
| valign="top" |
 How To Start Your Own Country/Citizen TV – Lee Phillips, Julian Pearson, Patrick Cameron All New Cosmetic Surgery Live (Mobile Streaming) – Morgan Holt, Genevieve Dersley, Pasa Mustafa
 Dr Who: Attack Of The Graske (Interactive Red Button Game) – Jo Pearce, Andrew Whitehouse
 Lost Untold (Website) – Janine Smith, Mark Limb, Tracy Blacher
| valign="top" |
 Help – Vanessa White, Neill Gorton Casanova – Christine Allsopp
 Elizabeth I – Fae Hammond
 Bleak House – Daniel Phillips
|-
|-
! style="background:#BDB76B; width:50%" |  Best Costume Design
! style="background:#BDB76B; width:50%" |  Best Production Design
|-
| valign="top" |
 Bleak House – Andrea Galer To the Ends of the Earth – Rosalind Ebbutt
 The Queen's Sister – James Keast
 Elizabeth I – Mike O'Neill
| valign="top" |
 Bleak House – Simon Elliott Rome – Joseph Bennett
 Elizabeth I – Eve Stewart
 To the Ends of the Earth – Donal Woods
|-
|-
! style="background:#BDB76B; width:50%" |  Best Photography and Lighting - Fiction/Entertainment
! style="background:#BDB76B; width:50%" |  Best Photography - Factual
|-
| valign="top" |
 The Girl in the Café – Chris Seager To the Ends of the Earth – Ulf Brantas
 Twenty Thousand Streets Under the Sky – John Daly
 Bleak House – Kieran McGuigan
| valign="top" |
 Tsunami: 7 Hours On Boxing Day – Paul Otter A Picture of Britain – Fred Fabre
 Real Families: My Skin Could Kill Me – Chris Holland
 Michael Palin And The Mystery Of Hammershoi – Neville Kidd
|-
|-
! style="background:#BDB76B; width:50%" |  Best Editing - Fiction/Entertainment
! style="background:#BDB76B; width:50%" |  Best Editing - Factual
|-
| valign="top" |
 Bleak House – Paul Knight Casanova – Nick Arthurs
 To the Ends of the Earth – Philip Kloss
 The Ghost Squad – Adam Recht
| valign="top" |
 The Year London Blew Up: 1974 – Paul Binns Born in the USSR: 21 Up – Kim Horton
 49 Up – Kim Horton
 Jamie's School Dinners – Sunshine Jackson
|-
|-
! style="background:#BDB76B; width:50%" |  Best Sound - Fiction/Entertainment
! style="background:#BDB76B; width:50%" |  Best Sound - Factual
|-
| valign="top" |
 Colditz – Sound Team To the Ends of the Earth – Paul Hamblin, Rory Farnan, Craig Butters, Clive Derbyshire
 Bleak House – Sound Team
 Spooks – Sound Team
| valign="top" |
 Tsunami: 7 Hours On Boxing Day – Ben Baird, Gregor Lyon, Brian Howell Holocaust: A Music Memorial Film From Auschwitz – Ben Baird, Mike Hatch
 The Genius Of Beethoven – Ben Baird, Andy Rose, Tony Meering
 Life in the Undergrowth – Sound Team
|-
|-
! style="background:#BDB76B; width:50%" |  Best Visual Effects
! style="background:#BDB76B; width:50%" |  Best Titles
|-
| valign="top" |
 Hiroshima: BBC History of World War II – Red Vision, Mike Tucker, Gareth Edwards Walking with Monsters – Framestore Team
 Rome – Barrie Hemsley, James Madigan, Joe Pavlo
 Supervolcano – Lola
| valign="top" |
 Life in the Undergrowth – Mick Connaire Hustle – Berger and Wyse
 Jamie's School Dinners – Matt Utber
 Rome – Angus Wall
|-
|}

Special awards
 Eileen DissInteractive Innovation
 BBC Open Earth Archive'''

See also
 2006 British Academy Television Awards

References

External links
British Academy Craft Awards official website

2006 television awards
2006 in British television
2006 in London
May 2006 events in the United Kingdom
2006